Lachenalia corymbosa, the corymbous Cape cowslip, is a species of flowering plant in the genus Lachenalia native to the southwest Cape Provinces of South Africa. It has gained the Royal Horticultural Society's Award of Garden Merit.

References

corymbosa
Endemic flora of South Africa
Plants described in 2003